Julian is an 1823 historical tragedy by the British writer Mary Russell Mitford. It premiered at the Theatre Royal, Covent Garden on 15 March 1823.  The original cast included William Macready as Julian, Maria Foote as Alphonso, King of Sicily, George John Bennett as Duke of Melfi, William Abbot as Count D'Alba, Daniel Egerton as Leanti, Thomas Comer as Bertone and Maria Lacy as Annabel. Mitford wrote the play during the delays over the staging of her previous work Foscari which finally premiered in 1826. It is influenced by the 1820 rebellion on Sicily and its defeat and repression by Bourbon forces.

References

Bibliography
  Burwick, Frederick Goslee, Nancy Moore & Hoeveler Diane Long . The Encyclopedia of Romantic Literature. John Wiley & Sons,  2012.
 Nicoll, Allardyce. A History of Early Nineteenth Century Drama 1800-1850. Cambridge University Press, 1930.

1823 plays
West End plays
British plays
Tragedy plays
Historical plays
Plays set in Italy
Plays by Mary Russell Mitford